"Radio Free Europe" is the debut single by American alternative rock band R.E.M., released in 1981 on the short-lived independent record label Hib-Tone. The song features "what were to become the trademark unintelligible lyrics which have distinguished R.E.M.'s work ever since." The single received critical acclaim, and its success earned the band a record deal with I.R.S. Records. R.E.M. re-recorded the song for their 1983 debut album Murmur. The re-recording for I.R.S. became the group's first charting single, peaking at number 78 on the Billboard Hot 100 chart. The song is ranked number 389 in [[Rolling Stone's 500 Greatest Songs of All Time|Rolling Stone'''s 500 Greatest Songs of All Time]]. In 2010, it was added to the Library of Congress's National Recording Registry for setting "the pattern for later indie rock releases by breaking through on college radio in the face of mainstream radio's general indifference." The song was featured in the 1984 movie The Party Animal.

Origin and original recording
R.E.M. formed in Athens, Georgia, in 1980. The band quickly established itself in the local scene. Over the course of 1980 the band refined its songwriting skills, helped by its frequent gigs at local venues. One of the group's newer compositions was "Radio Free Europe". The other members of the band were reportedly awestruck when they heard the lyrics and melodies singer Michael Stipe had written for the song. By May 1981 the band added "Radio Free Europe" to its setlist.

After a successful show opening for The Police, R.E.M. intended to record material for a demo tape. The group traveled to Drive-In Studios in Winston-Salem, North Carolina, to record some songs with producer Mitch Easter, who was a member of the band Let's Active. The band recorded "Radio Free Europe", "Sitting Still", and the instrumental song "White Tornado", which were placed on a promotional cassette tape. The band sent out 400 copies, one of which was received by Atlanta law student Jonny Hibbert. Hibbert offered to release "Radio Free Europe" and "Sitting Still" as a one-off 7" vinyl single with the understanding that he would own the publishing rights for both songs; the band agreed to his terms. However, Hibbert felt the recording was unsatisfactory, and oversaw a remix. Easter said he found the presence of Hibbert "distracting" and added, "He came into my studio and it was like, now the big city guy is going to do it right. We mixed the song for about 12 hours and really, there wasn't enough equipment to warrant more than 45 minutes." The final mastering of the song disappointed the band. Guitarist Peter Buck, who described the recording years later as "muddy and hi-end", expressed his displeasure by breaking a copy of the finished single and nailing it to his wall. However, Buck admitted that "there's something to be said for the original sort of murky feeling for [the original recording]".

Cover art
The cover art to the single came courtesy of Michael Stipe. "Michael brought those negatives over to our place," explains photographer Terry Allen. "He said, 'Can you make a print of these?' and we said, 'What, you want a picture of this blur?' He said, 'Yeah,' and so I said, 'I've got a picture that's probably better than this that you can use,' but he said, 'No, I want this blur!'"

Around 600 copies of the first pressing were sent out for promotional uses, but these omitted the Hib-Tone contact address. It was included, however, on the 6,000 copies of the second pressing.

Composition

Both the Hib-Tone and I.R.S. releases of "Radio Free Europe" begin with brief instrumental intros before the band enters. The Hib-Tone version features a brief synthesizer figure. The intro to the I.R.S. version originated as an errant system hum accidentally recorded on tape. Easter triggered the effect to open and shut an electronic noise gate in time with bassist Mike Mills' playing. The producer then manually adjusted the EQ of the effect on the studio mixing console, and spliced the seven-bar figure into the start of the recording.

Drummer Bill Berry begins the song with a four-to-the-floor beat, and then the rest of the band enters. Berry plays a steady backbeat throughout the song. During the verses, Mills plays a fast eighth note bassline pulse, characteristic of punk rock and new wave. Guitarist Peter Buck plays the palm-muted lower strings of his guitar, marking the end of a four-bar repetition with an upstroke strummed chord. During the prechorus refrain, Buck switches to playing arpeggios, ending each four bar phrase with a full chord downstroke. Mills accompanies this section by performing independent melody lines with syncopated rhythms. Mills' last note of the refrain is doubled by a piano.

After two verses and two prechoruses, the band enters the song's chorus, where Stipe sings the phrase "Calling out in transit/Calling out in transit/Radio Free Europe". After a second chorus, a bridge section follows, where Mills' one-note ascending bassline is doubled by the piano. The band then plays a final verse-prechorus-chorus section. At the song's end, Buck plays an arpeggio figure similar to the prechorus refrain, and the band ends on an A chord.

Lyrics
Stipe's lyrics are hard to discern, and largely serve to give the singer something to vocalize with. When first developing the original song, Stipe intentionally did not want the lyrics to be understood, as he "...hadn't written any of the words yet."  Also, when the song was played live, Stipe improvised his own set of lyrics halfway through the song. In a 1988 NME interview, Stipe denied the interviewer's claim that his lyrics on Murmur were "indecipherable", but acknowledged that "Radio Free Europe" was one of the few exceptions, describing it as "complete babbling". While the lyrics to the song have never been published by the band, lyrics to "Radio Free Europe" were published in Song Hits magazine in 1983, and in New Sounds magazine in January 1984. Despite the song being named after the United States government broadcaster Radio Free Europe/Radio Liberty, Mike Mills claimed in the liner notes to the two-CD edition of And I Feel Fine... The Best of the I.R.S. Years 1982–1987 that the song's content was unrelated to the network and that the name was picked purely because it sounded appealing.

The San Francisco-based band Game Theory, whose albums were also produced by Mitch Easter, began in 1985 to cover the song in their shows, with lyrics sung clearly by Scott Miller. According to drummer Gil Ray, "Either Buck or Stipe told Scott Miller in our band the real words to 'Radio Free Europe' and every now and then we'd do it as a cover because Scott knew the words. It was a big deal to know the words to any of their songs." Miller's first live performance of the song, in September 1985, appears as a bonus track on the 2014 CD reissue of Game Theory's Dead Center.

Re-recording and I.R.S. single release

R.E.M. signed to I.R.S. Records in 1982. I.R.S. asked R.E.M. to re-record "Radio Free Europe" in 1983 for their debut album, Murmur. The band agreed, because they had felt that they'd improved significantly since the original 1981 sessions.

The 1983 version has some slightly different lyrics and a slower tempo, and is not as well-liked by the band as the original; indeed, the liner notes for the 1988 compilation album Eponymous (on which the original Hib-Tone version is featured) stated that "Mike and Jefferson think this one [referring to the Hib-Tone version] crushes the other one like a grape." Peter Buck has also stated that he "[didn't] think we captured it the way we did on the single."  Original producer Mitch Easter also commented on the re-recording, saying it was "more pro, but a little too sedate."

The re-recorded version of "Radio Free Europe" was the first single from Murmur. It was the first R.E.M. single to reach the charts, peaking at number 78 on the Billboard singles chart and remaining on the chart for five weeks. The song also reached number 25 on the Billboard Hot Mainstream Rock Tracks chart.Cash Box reviewed the single and commented on "its toughened-up Byrds jangly guitar and vocal style."  Record World said it has "a touch of anarchy and enough unrestrained energy to charge a dance hall for an entire evening" and that "What [R.E.M.] lack in finesse is compensated for with driving rock spirit.
A live performance at Larry's Hideaway, Toronto, Canada, from July 9, 1983, was released on the 2008 Deluxe Edition reissue of Murmur.

Music video
At the request of MTV, the 1983 single was accompanied by a music video, directed by Arthur Pierson. The video took place in the garden of artist Howard Finster, who would go on to paint the album cover for the band's second album, Reckoning.

Charts

Track listings
All songs written by Bill Berry, Peter Buck, Mike Mills, and Michael Stipe unless otherwise indicated.

Hib-Tone version
"Radio Free Europe" – 3:46
"Sitting Still" – 3:07

I.R.S. version
"Radio Free Europe" (edit) – 3:10
"There She Goes Again" (Lou Reed) – 2:49

References
Black, Johnny. Reveal: The Story of R.E.M. Backbeat, 2004. 
Buckley, David. R.E.M.: Fiction: An Alternative Biography. Virgin, 2002. 
Fletcher, Tony. Remarks Remade – The Story of R.E.M. Omnibus Press, 2002. 
Charlton, Katherine. Rock Music Styles: A History. McGraw Hill, 2003. 
Niimi, J. Murmur''. The Continuum International Publishing Group Inc., 2005.

Notes

1981 debut singles
1981 songs
1983 singles
Hib-Tone singles
I.R.S. Records singles
R.E.M. songs
Song recordings produced by Don Dixon (musician)
Song recordings produced by Mitch Easter
Songs about radio
Songs written by Bill Berry
Songs written by Michael Stipe
Songs written by Mike Mills
Songs written by Peter Buck
United States National Recording Registry recordings
American punk rock songs